Gitana Kerpiėnė (born 3 July 1967) is a Lithuanian former footballer who played as a midfielder. She has been a member of the Lithuania women's national team.

References

1967 births
Living people
Women's association football midfielders
Lithuanian women's footballers
Lithuania women's international footballers
Gintra Universitetas players